Beaut or Beauts may refer to:

 Buffalo Beauts, a professional women's ice hockey team based in Amherst, New York, United States
 Jigsaw (Marvel Comics), a fictional character known as "the Beaut" before his disfigurement
 Norman "Beaut" McGregor, protagonist of the 1917 novel Marching Men by Sherwood Anderson
 Joseph Humphreys (1872–1936), American boxing official and announcer nicknamed "Joe the Beaut"

See also
 Lobostemon belliformis, a plant species also known as the beaut healthbush
 Beauty